The Alarm is a 1914 American short comedy film directed by and starring Fatty Arbuckle. This silent film was produced by Mack Sennett and The Keystone Film Company and distributed by Mutual Film Corporation. It was released on May 28, 1914.

Cast
 Roscoe 'Fatty' Arbuckle
 Minta Durfee
 Hank Mann
 Mabel Normand
 Al St. John

See also
 List of American films of 1914
 Fatty Arbuckle filmography

References

External links

1914 films
Films directed by Roscoe Arbuckle
Silent American comedy films
1914 comedy films
1914 short films
American silent short films
American black-and-white films
Films with screenplays by Roscoe Arbuckle
American comedy short films
1910s American films